Sharad Rao (21 March 1957 – 2 September 2017) was an Indian cricketer. He played in ten first-class and three List A matches from 1980/81 to 1985/86, including the final of the 1980–81 Ranji Trophy.

See also
 List of Mumbai cricketers
List of Karnataka cricketers

References

External links
 

1957 births
2017 deaths
Indian cricketers
Mumbai cricketers
Karnataka cricketers
Place of birth missing